Josué Jéhouda (born Koldriansky; March 19, 1892 – March 19, 1966) was a Swiss Zionist  writer and journalist.

Born in Russia, he fought in the Jewish Legion during World War I, and worked in the Zionist committee in Zürich up until the Balfour Declaration of 1917, founding the Revue juive magazine in Geneva.

He was author of the Histoire de la colonie juive de Genève 1843–1943 (1944), of the novel cycle La tragédie d'Israël (Miriam and De père en fils; 1927–1928), and of La Terre Promise (1926).

In the early 1910s, he boosted Panait Istrati's career by teaching him French and helping him during his illness.

In 1947, he was a delegate to the Seelisberg Conference.

He died on 19 March 1966 (the day of his 74th birthday) in Geneva.

References 

Swiss male novelists
Swiss Jews
Swiss Zionists
Swiss people of World War I
1892 births
1966 deaths
20th-century Swiss novelists
20th-century male writers
Russian emigrants to Switzerland
Place of birth missing
20th-century Swiss journalists